The Waihi Daily Telegraph was a newspaper published in Waikato, New Zealand. It was published from 1901 to 1951. It replaced the Waihi Chronicle.

References 

Defunct newspapers published in New Zealand
Waikato
Publications established in 1901
1901 establishments in New Zealand
Publications disestablished in 1951
1951 disestablishments in New Zealand